The official German airplay chart is an airplay chart compiled by MusicTrace on behalf of Bundesverband Musikindustrie (Federal Association of Phonographic Industry; BVMI). The chart was introduced in 1977 and was first compiled by Nielsen Music Control and since September 2015 by MusicTrance.
The Current Number One is "Flowers" by Miley Cyrus.

Records

Song achievements

Most weeks at number one 
13 weeks
 Nelly Furtado – "Say It Right" (2007)
9 weeks
 Leona Lewis – "Bleeding Love" (2008)
 Robbie Williams – "Bodies" (2009)
 Robin Schulz featuring Francesco Yates – "Sugar" (2015)
8 weeks
 Daniel Powter – "Bad Day" (2005)
 Pink – "So What" (2008)
 Pink – "Blow Me (One Last Kiss)" (2012)
 Rihanna – "Diamonds" (2012/2013)
 Avicii featuring Aloe Blacc – "Wake Me Up" (2013)
 Katy Perry – "Roar" (2013)
 Adele – "Hello" (2015/2016)
 Justin Timberlake – "Can't Stop the Feeling!" (2016)
 David Guetta – "Flames" (2018)
 Calvin Harris – "Promises" (2018)
 Ed Sheeran and Justin Bieber – "I Don't Care" (2019)
 Ed Sheeran – "Bad Habits" (2021)
 Harry Styles –  "As It Was" (2022)
7 weeks 
 Robbie Williams – "Tripping" (2005)
 Madonna – "Hung Up" (2005/2006)
 Nelly Furtado – "All Good Things (Come to an End)" (2006/2007)
 James Blunt – "1973" (2007)
 Timbaland presents OneRepublic – "Apologize" (2007/2008)
 Pink – "Raise Your Glass" (2010)
 Jessie J featuring B.o.B – "Price Tag" (2011)
 Marlon Roudette – "New Age" (2011)
 Ed Sheeran – "Shape of You" (2017)
 Shawn Mendes – "Señorita" (2019)

Artist achievements

Most weeks at number one

Most number-one songs

Number-one songs by year

2006

2007

2008

2009

2010

2011

2012

2013

Weblinks
 radiocharts.com

References

German record charts